Motnik is a village in the Tuhinj Valley in the Municipality of Kamnik in the Upper Carniola region of Slovenia.

Churches

The parish church in Motnik is dedicated to Saint George and is a Baroque building with 19th-century furnishings. Close by is a smaller church, the chapel of Mary Magdalene.

Pygmy rhinoceros
Close to the settlement is also an abandoned brown coal mine in which the fossilized remains of a pygmy rhinoceros were discovered in 1910. They were found to be 25 million years old and are now displayed in a small museum in the village.

References

External links

Motnik on Geopedia
Motnik.net
Motnik on Google Maps (map, photographs, street view)

Populated places in the Municipality of Kamnik